Man Dance is an album by Ronald Shannon Jackson and The Decoding Society, recorded in 1982 for the Antilles label.

Reception

The AllMusic review by Scott Yanow stated: "The ensemble-oriented 'free funk' music of drummer Ronald Shannon Jackson's Decoding Society never can be accused of being overly mellow or lacking in excitement ... The frenetic and intense ensembles (essentially everyone solos at once) would not be classified as relaxing background music." NPR thought that "the spiky Afro-pop guitar, two grumbling electric basses and melodies played in several keys at once are all out of Ornette Coleman's band Prime Time. But the Decoding Society had a lazier lope and wasn't quite so eager to fill all the available space."

Track listing
All compositions by Ronald Shannon Jackson.
 "Man Dance" - 4:32
 "Iola" - 5:24
 "Spanking" - 3:07
 "Catman" - 6:42
 "The Art of Levitation" - 1:24
 "Belly Button" - 4:45
 "Giraffe" - 3:09
 "When Souls Speak" - 5:48
 "Alice in the Congo" - 6:09

Personnel
Ronald Shannon Jackson – drums
David Gordon (tracks 1, 2 & 8), Henry Scott (tracks 3-7 & 9) – trumpet, flugelhorn
Zane Massey – tenor saxophone, alto saxophone, soprano saxophone
Lee Rozie – tenor saxophone, soprano saxophone (tracks 1, 2 & 8)
Vernon Reid – electric guitar, steel guitar, Roland guitar synthesizer, banjo
Melvin Gibbs – electric bass
Reverend Bruce Johnson – fretless electric bass, electric bass

References

External links
 Ronald Shannon Jackson on "Mandance", accessed November 1, 2016

1982 albums
Ronald Shannon Jackson albums
Antilles Records albums